Mocadorada (also known as Mocadorà, derived word from Mocador, the Valencian word for handkerchief), is a tradition from the Valencian Community celebrated each October 9, concurring with the National Day of Valencia. It consists of a collection of  frutta martorana where the marzipan fruits are held inside of a handkerchief.

The mocadorà takes part of Saint Denis festivities in the Valencian Community, being considered both the Lover's day and the National Day, being also a Public Holiday since 1982. As part of the Lover's day celebrations, the tradition states that the mocadorà is given as a present to a beloved person.

References

Days celebrating love
Saints days
History of the Valencian Community